Ohio's 5th senatorial district centers on Dayton and currently consists of the counties of Miami and Preble along with portions of the counties of Darke and Montgomery.  It encompasses Ohio House districts 39, 43 and 80.  It has a Cook PVI of D+6.  Its current Ohio Senator is Republican Steve Huffman.

List of senators

References

External links
Ohio's 5th district senator at the 130th Ohio General Assembly official website

Ohio State Senate districts